Industrial High School is a public high school located in Vanderbilt, Texas, United States and classified as a 3A school by the UIL. It is part of the Industrial Independent School District located in south central Jackson County. In 2015, the school was rated "Met Standard" by the Texas Education Agency.

Athletics
The Industrial Cobras compete in these sports - 

Cross country, volleyball, football, basketball, powerlifting, golf, tennis, track, softball and baseball

Baseball
Basketball
Cross country
Golf
Football
Powerlifting
Softball
Tennis
Track and field
Volleyball

State titles
Boys Golf - 
1984(2A)
Volleyball- 2019(3A)

Notable alumni
Laura Creavalle - (born January 25, 1959) Guyanese-born Canadian/American professional bodybuilder
Brandon Green - (born September 5, 1980) professional football player for the Jacksonville Jaguars, St. Louis Rams & Seattle Seahawks of the NFL

References

External links
Industrial ISD

Schools in Jackson County, Texas
Public high schools in Texas
1949 establishments in Texas